The 2012 Guzzini Challenger was a professional tennis tournament played on hard courts. It was the tenth edition of the tournament which was part of the 2012 ATP Challenger Tour. It took place in Recanati, Italy between 16 and 22 July 2012.

Singles main-draw entrants

Seeds

 1 Rankings are as of July 9, 2012.

Other entrants
The following players received wildcards into the singles main draw:
  Marco Cecchinato
  Evgeny Korolev
  Giacomo Miccini
  Federico Torresi

The following players received entry from the qualifying draw:
  Daniel Cox
  Marin Draganja
  Chris Letcher
  Dane Propoggia

Champions

Singles

 Simone Bolelli def.  Fabrice Martin,  6–3, 6–2

Doubles

 Brydan Klein /  Dane Propoggia def.  Marin Draganja /  Dino Marcan, 7–5, 2–6, [14–12]

External links
Official Website

Guzzini Challenger
Guzzini Challenger
2012 in Italian tennis